A volatile corrosion inhibitor (VCI) is a material that protects metals from corrosion. V.VCI is also called Vacuum VCI meaning they have special properties of performance in vacuum  as well as corrosion protection properties. Corrosion inhibitors are chemical compounds that can decrease the corrosion rate of a material, typically a metal or an alloy. NACE International Standard TM0208 defines volatile corrosion inhibitor (VCI) as a chemical substance that acts to reduce corrosion by a combination of volatilization from a VCI material, vapor transport in the atmosphere of an enclosed environment, and condensation onto surface in the space, including absorption, dissolution, and hydrophobic effects on metal surfaces, where the rate of corrosion of metal surfaces is thereby inhibited. They also called vapor-phase inhibitors, vapor-phase corrosion inhibitors, and vapor-transported corrosion inhibitors.

VCIs come in various formulations that are dependent on the type of system they will be used in; for example, films, oils, coatings, cleaners, etc. There are also variety of formulations that provide protection in ferrous, nonferrous, or multi-metal applications. Other variables include the amount of vapor phase compared to contact phase inhibitors (1). Because they are volatile at ambient temperature, VCI compounds can reach inaccessible crevices in metallic structures (2).

History
The first widescale use of VCIs can be traced to Shell's patent for dicyclohexylammonium nitrite (DICHAN), which was eventually commercialized as VPI 260. (3)  DICHAN was used extensively by the US military to protect a wide variety of metallic components from corrosion via various delivery systems, VCI powder, VCI paper, VCI solution, VCI slushing compound, etc.

Safety and health concerns as well as inherent limitations has led to the abandonment of DICHAN as a VCI. (4) At present, commercial VCI compounds are typically salts of moderately strong bases and weak volatile acids.  The typical bases are amines and the acids are carbonic, nitrous and carboxylic. (5)

VCI corrosion protection mechanism 
For steel, the first step will be the volatilization of the inhibitor into the airspace.  This may entail simple evolution of the molecule or the chemical may dissociate first and then volatilize. (6)  The molecules will then diffuse through the enclosed airspace until some of the molecules will reach the metallic surface to be protected.  There are two likely paths once the molecules reach the metallic surface.  First the molecule may adsorb onto the metal surface thereby forming a barrier to aggressive ions and displacing any condensed water. (6),(7).   

The second path involves the condensed water layer that has been shown to exist on the metallic surface (8).  The VCI molecules will dissolve into the condensed water layer, raising the pH. An alkaline pH has been shown to have a beneficial effect on the corrosion resistance for steel. (6)

The mechanism for copper begins the same as for steel, evolution of the inhibitor.  Once at the copper surface however the inhibitor and will form a copper benzotriazole complex which is protective. (9)

Vapor pressure is critical parameter in VCI effectiveness. The most favorable range of pressure is 10−3 to 10−2 Pa at room temperature. Insufficient pressure leads to the slow establishment of the protective layer; if the pressure is too high, VCI effectiveness is limited to a short time. (10-11)

Product uses
VCIs have been applied across a wide variety of application areas:

Packaging – One of the first widespread uses for VCIs was VCI paper which was used to wrap parts for transportation and/or storage.  The technology then evolved with the development of VCI film, where the inhibitor was incorporated into Polyethylene film. (8). This offered the advantage that parts could be stored in the VCI film without any rust-preventative (RP) oil, which would typically have to be removed before part was placed into service. In places where the VCI film is in direct contact with the metal, VCI molecules adsorb on the metal surfaces, creating an invisible molecular barrier against corrosive elements such as oxygen, moisture, and chlorides. As VCI molecules vaporize out of the film and diffuse throughout the package, they also form a protective molecular layer on metal surfaces not in direct contact with the film. When the packaging is removed, the VCI molecules simply vaporize and float away.(12) VCI films protect metals both through direct contact and vapor action. Large Equipment/Assets are wrapped in VCI heat shrinkable film for long term outdoor storage.  The use of polymer films for thorough protection of electronic equipment during shipment or storage should take into account the prevention of electrostatic discharge (ESD), corrosion, and the disposal of the film after use. A main property that makes a polymer film a viable packaging material for electronic equipment is the film’s ability to eliminate electrostatic discharge. The most recent property addition to VCI film is biodegradability.(12)

Coatings - The use of VCIs as alternative corrosion inhibitor technologies in coating is not a new concept. In the last few years, however, with the growing environmental pressure to reduce the use of traditional inhibitors containing heavy metals, they have gained in popularity. Since VCI particles have a polar attraction to the metal substrate, this allows them to work in the coating without negatively impacting other components of the coating, such as defoamers, wetting agents, levelling agents, etc. VCIs are typically added to the formulation in very small amounts by weight of the overall formula. The particle size of the VCIs is very small in comparison to traditionally used inhibitors. This allows the VCIs to migrate into the smaller voids more effectively. Once the VCIs have adsorbed on the surface of the metal, they provide an effective barrier that is hydrophobic and prevents moisture from getting through to the metal surface. Consequently, this prevents the formation of a corrosion cell and renders the moisture ineffective (13).

Emitter – VCI in the form of a capsule, foam, cup, etc., is placed within an electrical cabinet, junction box, etc., to provide corrosion protection to the various components inside the box. VCI emitters are also provide best protection against H2S, SO2, ammonia & humidity, It is mostly use in electrical components because it does not affect electrical, surface or optical properties

Pipe casings – A mixture of VCI and a swellable gel is injected into the annular space between the pipe casing (the outer pipe) and the carrier pipe (the inner pipe) as to provide corrosion protection to the carrier pipe.  This application has recently been of wider interest as it has been approved by PHMSA as a means to address a shorted casing in a CP protected pipeline.  (PHMSA rules dictate that a shorted casing on a PHMSA regulated pipeline be repaired or treated).  Details can also be found in NACE SP-200. (14)

Pipeline preservation (internal) - VCIs are seeing widespread application for the mitigation of corrosion of the internal surfaces of new and/or existing out-of-service pipelines.(9) Top-of-the-line TOL corrosion typically occurs in wet gas pipelines that have a stratified flow regime and poor thermal insulation. TOL corrosion is predominantly a problem of protection in the gas phase (15). Tests showed that the best potential for providing corrosion protection for TOL came from azoles, certain acetylene alcohols, and a "green" volatile aldehyde. (16)

For new pipelines, the time period between hydrotesting and operations can be very unpredictable and may extend for months.  Historical data has shown that significant corrosion issues can arise as a result of residual hydrotest water (14).  For a piggable pipeline, an aqueous solution of VCI is pushed down the pipeline between two pigs after completion of the hydrotest operation.  This provides corrosion mitigation until the line is put into service. (14) For a non-piggable pipeline, the low sections where residual hydrotest water may collect after draining are identified and an aqueous VCI solution is added at nearby high points such that the inhibitor solution will flow into the low sections, thereby treating the residual water with inhibitor. (14)

For pipeline sections that are being idled, the low lying sections are identified, and an inhibitor solution is added at nearby high points as to fill the low lying section to a predetermined depth. (14)

Aboveground storage tanks (Soilside Bottom) - The bottoms of aboveground storage tanks are typically coated on the inside (product side) to prevent corrosion.  The other side of the bottom, (soilside) is not coated and the unprotected steel rests directly on a foundation.  There are various styles of foundations:  a concrete ringwall with a sand bed and a liner, a hard pad, such as concrete or asphalt, a double bottom and finally simple soil. (14)  VCIs are applied via various methods depending the tank foundation.

For tanks with a concrete ringwall, a sand bed and a liner, the VCI is typically installed as an aqueous solution.  The solution is either injected at minimal pressure through the leak detection ports, (distribution of the solution through the sand is primarily via capillary action) or through a preinstalled distribution system of perforated pipes. (17) The tank can be in or out of service.

Various options are available for a tank on a hard pad depending on whether the tank is in or out of service. For a tank that is in service, a ring of perforated pipes is installed at the edge of the chime sealed via a membrane that creates an enclosed space between the tank chime and the hard pad foundation.  The VCI is supplied as a powder in mesh sleeves that are threaded into the perforated pipes.  Upon depletion of the VCI, the mesh sleeves are removed, and new sleeves installed. (19) For a tank that is out of service with the floor removed, grooves are cut into the hard pad.  A channel is also cut from the end of the groove to extend beyond the tank chime.  Perforated pipe with a mesh cover is laid at the bottom of the cut grooves.  The groove is then filled with sand.  The tank bottom is then installed as normal. The VCI is supplied as a powder in mesh sleeves that are installed into the perforated pipe.  The ends of the perforated pipes are sealed closed.  Upon depletion of the VCI, the mesh sleeves are removed, and new sleeves installed. (18)  For a tank that is out of service without the floor removed, the typical approach is to inject the VCI as an aqueous solution through ports that have been installed through the floor which often are the helium ports that were used to verify the tank floor integrity. (19)

There are two typical geometries for double bottom tank.  In the first, the space between the two floors has a liner and a sand bed and for the second, a liner and a concrete pad with radial slots.  (This style of double bottom is often called an El Segundo double bottom).  For a double bottom with a liner and sand bed, the VCI is supplied as an aqueous solution which is injected through the leak detection ports.   For an El Segundo bottom that is in service, the VCI is again supplied as an aqueous solution that is injected through the leak detection ports.  The ports are sealed closed and the solution is allowed to stand for a short period of time.  The ports are then opened and the VCI solution is drained leaving a residual amount of the VCI solution within the space.  This residual VCI provides the corrosion protection for the space. For an El Segundo bottom that is out of service, perforated pipes are installed into the grooves in the concrete that have leak detection ports.  Mesh sleeves containing inhibitor powder is inserted into the perforated pipes and the leak detection ports are closed.

Aboveground storage tanks (Roofs) – The environment in the headspace of an aboveground storage tank can be very aggressive especially for tanks storing crude oil.  The environment is aggressive as a result of the acidic species that are typically found in crude oil, (sour crude).  Corrosion protection is supplied via a system of dispensers that have been attached to ports that have been installed on the tank roof.  (Ports and shut-off valves are installed when the tank is out of service).  Bottles containing the VCI are placed in the dispenser and the shut off valves are opened.  The VCI has a high vapor pressure such that the inhibitor will saturate the airspace within the dispenser and then will diffuse through the open port into the storage tank headspace. (20,21)

Oils - The most common use of VCIs in oils is for the protection of oil containing systems like an engine or hydraulics during intermittent use or during longer-term storage (mothballing).  The VCI treated oil is typically added to the existing oil and the unit is run to fully circulate the treated oil throughout the system.  The system is then shut off for storage.  The VCI treated oil can also be fogged into void spaces within a system or enclosed space. (21)

Interior of large enclosed spaces – VCIs have been used to protect the interior of equipment such as tanks, vessels, boilers, piping, heat exchangers, etc., especially for voids and/or recessed areas of interior cavities during storage and/or transportation.  The typical means are fogging/blowing the VCI powder into the interior space or applying the VCI powder in packet form.  For smaller volumes, the packets are simply distributed within the space.  For larger volumes, the packets are attached to leads that are then hung at the perimeter of the space. (22)

Water treatment – Aqueous VCI solutions have been used to flush/rinse pipelines, pumps, manifolds, enclosed pits, heat exchangers, etc. as preparation for mothballing/storage.

Specialty covers – VCI film covers have been used to protect flanges, valves, etc. in harsh environments such as chemical processing plants, offshore platforms, etc. (25)

See also
Cosmoline
Desiccant
Corrosion engineering

References

 Y.I. Kuznetsov, et al, “Inhibiting Action and Absorption of Beta-Aminoketones on Metals” Zasshchita Metallov 32, 5 (1966), pp. 528–533
 Miksic, B.A., Chandler, C; Cortec Corporation; Environmentally Friendly VCIs, NACE Materials Performance, February 2003. 
 Lyublisnki, E, Natale, T; (2013), Corrosion Inhibitors for the Long-term Protection of Enclosures, NACE
 Wachter, A,  Stillman, N; Shell, US Patent 2,449,962, Dicyclohexylammonium Nitrite And It's Preparation
 Henderson, J;  (November 2, 2004) Clearing The Air Around Vapor Corrosion Inhibitors, Materials Today 
 A Working Party Report On Corrosion Inhibitors, (1994), European Federation of Corrosion Publications    (Page 2) 
 Sastri, V ; (1998) Corrosion Inhibitors,  Principles and Applications, John Wiley and Sons
 Leygraf, C; (2000), Atmospheric Corrosion, Pg 10–11, Wiley Interscience,  New York
 Working with Copper:  Benzotriazole: An Effective Corrosion Inhibitor for Copper Alloys, (2009), Copper Development Association 
 Koch, G.H, Brongers, M.P.H, Thomposon, N.G, Virmani, Y.P, Payer, J.H, "Corrosion Costs and Preventive Strategies In the United States" FHWA-RD-01-156 (McLean, VA: FHWA), 2002
 Miksic, B.A., Use of Vapor Phase Inhibitors for Corrosion Protection of Metal Products, CORROSION/83, paper no. 308, NACE International 1983, Houston, Texas
 Kean, R, Miksic, B.A., Rogan, I; Biodegradable Corrosion Inhibitor Packaging for Electronic Equipment, EUROCORR 2016, Paper #51882, Montpellier, France
 Bieber, M; Cortec Corporation, The Use of VCIs in Conjunction with or Replacement of Traditional Corrosion Inhibitors,  NACE Materials Performance, Supplement to June 2019
 NACE SP200-2014, Steel-Cased Pipeline Practices, National Association of Corrosion Engineers, Houston, Texas
 Singer, M, Nesic, S, Gunatlun, Y; Top of the Line Corrosion in Presence of Acetic Acid and Carbon Dioxide", Corrosion 2004, paper no. 04377, Houston, Texas, 2004. 
 Miksic, B.A., Shen, M, Furman, A, Kharshan, R, Whited, T; Cortec Corrosion; Vapor Corrosion Inhibitors for Top-of-the-Line Corrosion, NACE Materials Performance, August 2013. 
 Gendron, L, Natale; (April 15–19, 2018) Application of Volatile Corrosion Inhibitor to Prevent Internal Corrosion, NACE
 Place, T, Sasaki, G, Cathrea, C, Holm, M;  (September 24–28, 2012) Pressure Test Planning to Prevent Internal Corrosion by Residual Fluids; Place Proceedings of the 9th International Pipeline Conference, Calgary, Alberta, Canada
 Myers, P; (1997)  Aboveground Storage Tanks, McGraw-Hill New York
 Adelakin, K;  (March 26–30, 2017) External Corrosion Protection of Underside Bottom of Aboveground Storage Tanks Using Vaporized Corrosion Inhibitors,  NACE, New Orleans, LA
 Lyublinski, E, Natale, T; NTIC, US Patent 9,303,380, Systems For Corrosion Protection Of Storage Tank Soil Side Bottoms
 Lyublinski, E, Natale, T; NTIC, US Patent 9,556,635, Storage Tank Bottom Corrosion Protection System 
 Vendramini,  J, Natale, T;  (September 11–15, 2016),  Corrosion Protection of Storage Tank Bottoms New Application Experience,  EuroCorr, Montpellier France
 Kaman A, Labine, P, Miksic B.A., Reviews on Corrosion Inhibitors Science and Technology, NACE, pp. 11–16, Houston, Texas
 Bavarian, B, Reiner, L, Avanessian, A.B., Yakani, R, College of Engineering and Computer Science, California State University, Northridge, California, USA; Miksic, B.A., Cortec Corporation; Application of Vapor phase Corrosion Inhibitors for Contaminated Environments, NACE Materials Performance, June 2019
 Zerust ReCast - R Inhibitor System, 2012 Materials Performance Readers' Choice Innovation of the Year Awards 
 Innovation Product Development  - VCI Technology Applications Presentation,  September 21, 2012  University of Akron NCERCAMP Corrosion Forum 
 Twigg, R J; (1989) Guidelines for the Mothballing of Process Plants, Materials Technology Institute of the Chemical Process Industries Inc., MTI Publication No 34    
 Lyublisnki, E, Natale, T; (March 9–13, 2014 ),  Corrosion Protection of Mothballed Equipment  NACE, San Antonio, Texas
 Zerust Flange Savers, 2012 Materials Performance Readers' Choice Innovation of the Year Awards  

Corrosion inhibitors
Corrosion prevention
Packaging
Coatings
Corrosion